This is a list of Canadian films which were released in 1996:

See also
 1996 in Canada
 1996 in Canadian television

Notes

External links
Feature Films Released In 1996 With Country of Origin Canada at IMDb

1996
1996 in Canadian cinema
Canada